The Cupa Romaniei la Hochei pe gheață is the national ice hockey cup competition in Romania.

Winners

(when available)

Titles by team

References

External links
Romanian Ice Hockey Federation

Ice hockey competitions in Romania
României